The Château de Tiffauges is a medieval castle situated in the French commune of Tiffauges in the Vendée département.

The castle is also known as the château de Barbe-bleue (Bluebeard's castle) after its most famous resident, Gilles de Rais, known as Barbe-bleue.  It was here that Bluebeard perpetrated his atrocities.

Location
The castle is in the Marches (border lands) between Brittany, Poitou and Anjou and thus an important strategic point. It is positioned on a hill at the confluence of the  Sèvre Nantaise and Crûme rivers, this position providing protection against assailants.

History
The castle was built between the 12th and 16th centuries. The notorious murderer, Gilles de Rais (1404–1440) is associated with the castle.

For a long time, the castle was abandoned and lay in ruins, the inner yard even used for a while as a football pitch by the local club, RST Tiffauges. The castle is now owned by the Conseil Général of Vendée.  It hosts a series of spectacles and collections, including medieval war machines and an alchemy centre.

The castle has been classified as a monument historique by the French Ministry of Culture since 1957.

See also
 List of castles in France

References

External links 
 Official web site 
 
 Photograph and article on the château de Tiffauges

Castles in Pays de la Loire
Museums in Vendée
Historic house museums in Pays de la Loire
Monuments historiques of Pays de la Loire